Cordylostigma is a genus in the Rubiaceae. The name was coined in 2010 to contain 9 species formerly belonging to the related genus Kohautia.<ref name="Groeninckx2010">{{cite journal|vauthors=Groeninckx I, Ochoterena H, Smets E, Dessein S |year=2010|title=Molecular phylogenetic and morphological study of Kohautia (Spermacoceae, Rubiaceae), with the recognition of the new genus Cordylostigma|journal=Taxon|volume=59|issue=5|pages=1457–1471|doi=10.1002/tax.595011}}</ref> The nine species are native to tropical and southern Africa from Guinea to Somalia to South Africa, as well as Madagascar, Comoros, and Réunion.

SpeciesCordylostigma amboense (Schinz) Groeninckx & DesseinCordylostigma cicendioides (K.Schum.) Groeninckx & DesseinCordylostigma cuspidatum (K.Schum.) Groeninckx & DesseinCordylostigma longifolium (Klotzsch) Groeninckx & DesseinCordylostigma microcala (Bremek.) Groeninckx & DesseinCordylostigma obtusilobum (Hiern) Groeninckx & DesseinCordylostigma prolixipes (S.Moore) Groeninckx & DesseinCordylostigma stellarioides (Hiern) Groeninckx & DesseinCordylostigma virgatum'' (Willd.) Groeninckx & Dessein

References

External links
Cordylostigma in the World Checklist of Rubiaceae

Rubiaceae genera
Spermacoceae